The Earle Theatre was a 2768-seat theatre in Philadelphia, United States at 1046 Market Street, on the southeast corner of South 11th Street. It is associated with being a thriving venue for big band jazz music in the 1930s and 1940s.

History

The theatre, the most expensive venue in Philadelphia at the time of its opening on March 24, 1924, was originally called the Elrae (Earle spelled backwards), after Stanley Corporation stockholder George H. Earle. It was initially made for Vaudeville performances but was later adapted to a movie cinema. The theatre was a thriving venue for theatrical stage performances, films, and big band jazz music in the 1930s and 1940s, nurturing talents such as Duke Ellington, Benny Goodman and Billy Eckstine. The Count Basie Orchestra opened a one-week engagement at the Earle Theatre on Friday, 23 January 1942, breaking opening records. Basie also played at the Downbeat jazz club while in Philadelphia. Cab Calloway had an annual concert at the theatre.

The theatre returned to Vaudeville for periods, including April 1931 and September 1940, with a four-week production of Boom Town.
By 1953 the popularity of the theatre had declined due to the growth of television, and the last stage show was given on February 26, 1953. The theatre was demolished later that year and replaced with a two-story department store.

Architecture
At the time of construction in 1923, the theatre was the costliest theatre ever constructed in Philadelphia. The opulent grand theatre in the Italian renaissance style contained 2768 seats, of which 1164 seats were on the balcony. The stage measured 62 feet by 35 feet. George Matthews Harding painted the extravagant murals and friezes, and marble was imported from Italy.

Notable recordings

 1939: Jimmie Lunceford and His Orchestra: Live 1939 at the "Earle Theatre", Philadelphia.

References

External links
Old photographs at philadelphiabuildings.org
Photo of the interior

1924 establishments in Pennsylvania
1953 establishments in Pennsylvania
Cinemas and movie theaters in Pennsylvania
Defunct jazz clubs in the United States
Jazz clubs in Philadelphia
Theatres in Philadelphia
Demolished buildings and structures in Philadelphia
Buildings and structures demolished in 1953